The Workers' Front (RF) is a democratic socialist and progressive political party in Croatia. Formed in May 2014 as a political initiative of workers, trade unionists, unemployed, and students in Croatia, it supports anti-clericalism anti-fascism, antimilitarism, eco-socialism, labour rights, progressivism, and socialist feminism. Some left-libertarian and Trotskyist (International Socialist Alternative) critics characterize it as left-wing populist in the mold of Podemos and SYRIZA.

Objectives and ideology
The Workers' Front has been compared to Spanish Podemos and Greek SYRIZA by the local and regional media.

With the relative success of the Democratic Socialism for the 21st Century (Croatian: Demokratski socijalizam 21. stoljeća) political programme used to bolster support during the presidential elections, which takes heavy inspiration from those of Bernie Sanders and Jeremy Corbyn, it is once again being used for the upcoming parliamentary elections. A party candidate running in the 8th electoral unit, Ljiljana Nikolovska, described democratic socialism in an interview with a local news site Glas Istre as follows:

Social, civil and environmental issues 
The party considers modern-day Croatia to not be a fully independent country, describing the country as a quasi-colony due to what it opines is the unfavorable economic relationship of Croatia with Western Europe, while at the same time praising SR Croatia for having a higher level of independence. It blames Franjo Tuđman for this described loss of independence. At the same time it has stated that while the League of Communists of Croatia had "positive elements", the RF was critical of the party, as they consider it only represented an "enlightened elite" as opposed to the mass of party members as a whole in a "democratic" way.

Workers' Front aims to become a broad progressive front, dedicated to radical change of political, economic and social relations, while fighting for the rights of working people and all the oppressed.

Workers' Front is trying to coordinate various "progressive struggles" – struggle for workers' rights and economic democracy, anti-capitalism, anti-fascism, struggle for women's and LGBT rights, ecology etc.

While the party has expressed the opinion that nationalism is not inherently a bad influence, it is critical of what it deems to be the "revisionist nationalism" of Croatia's leaders, which it links to the "genocidal extremes" during World War 2.

Economic policy 
The party categorically rejects the privatization carried out in Croatia during the 1990s, as it considers the process both incompatible with Croatian laws at the time, as well as a social injustice. It has declared a goal to undo all privatizations in which there were "irregularities".

Foreign policy 
The party has stated that while it does not oppose the idea of a "united Europe", it opposes the European Union on the grounds that it believes the organization enforces a neoliberal economic policy in Europe, which it deems is a cause for both economic inequality within the member states themselves, as well as between member states.

The RF opposes Croatian membership in NATO, which it deems to be linked to American imperialism.

It supports cooperation with the countries of the former Yugoslavia and has explicitly condemned the HDZ's involvement in Bosnia and Herzegovina, which it describes as "clientelism". It has come out in opposition to the rivalry and separation between Serbs and Croats, which it blames on the right-wing.

Immigration 
The RF blames the immigration pressure under which Croatia is under on unequal national development caused by capitalism. It opposes military measures taken against immigration, as it believes doing so only makes Croatia a "military province" dedicated to protecting EU borders at the cost of the nation's own independence.

History

On 3 October 2015 it was announced on the Workers' Front web site that the party has been disbanded after an attempted purge by a prominent member of the party. However, Workers' Front remained an officially registered party and went on with its activities, issuing a statement that its web site was taken over by a group trying to disband the party. Two weeks later this version of events, namely that the party still exists and that the web site was in control of a group of dissidents, was confirmed by a member of the dissident group.

Following this episode,  Workers' Front participated in an anticlerical protest in Zagreb, tried to place, but was denied a billboard featuring Ivica Todorić (the richest person in Croatia) and successfully registered for 2015 parliamentary election in three electoral districts.

In the following months, the party helped organize an antifascist demonstration against far-right groups celebrating the Nazi collaborator in Croatia, Ante Pavelić, during a church mass for Pavelić. The protest was assaulted by supporters of the Croatian far-right. Soon after that, Workers' Front staged the first organized cutting of the razor wire planted along the Croatia-Slovenia border, together with Slovenian activists in a cross-border demonstration of solidarity. The action was widely reported by regional media.

On 1 February 2016 the Workers' Front held a protest against the new government, particularly Minister of Culture Zlatko Hasanbegović, on St. Mark's Square, Zagreb with over 1000 participants.

In March 2017, Workers' Front announced their coalition with New Left for the upcoming local elections in Split and Zagreb. In Zagreb election Workers' Front ran in coalition with Zagreb is Ours, New Left, Sustainable Development of Croatia and For the City which won 7.64% votes and 4 seats in the Zagreb City Assembly, one of which belongs to Workers' Front. In Split election, the Workers' Front-New Left coalition won 4.36% of votes, failing to enter the city council.

On 8 September 2018, the Workers' Front signed a declaration of mutual cooperation with New Left, Sustainable Development of Croatia and the Socialist Labor Party of Croatia in Šibenik, Croatia. The Šibenik Declaration (Croatian: Šibenska deklaracija) contains various criticisms of Croatian society, as well as that of the current capitalist system in general, on which all the signing parties agree on and gather around. The Workers' Front, however, had implemented an article in the document which only it signed as the other parties found it unappealing for their programmes, it reads as follows:

On 18 December 2018, it was announced that Katarina Peović, a member of Workers' Front and a former member of Zagreb Assembly, will candidate for a President of Croatia in the upcoming elections. Official presentation of the candidate is scheduled to happen on 21 January 2018.

In May 2020, the Workers' Front joined the Green–Left Coalition in the 2020 Croatian parliamentary election in which they together won 7 seats in the Parliament, with Katarina Peović leading the list in the VIIIth electoral district. In December 2020, Workers' Front was expelled from the Green–Left Coalition over conflicts with other parties, namely for other parties refusing to stand behind Peović's candidature for the Mayor of Rijeka.

Electoral performance

Parliament of Croatia

Zagreb City Assembly

European Parliament

President of Croatia

References

2014 establishments in Croatia
Anti-clerical parties
Anti-fascism in Croatia
Anti-fascist organizations
Anti-militarism in Europe
Democratic socialist parties in Europe
Direct democracy parties
Ecosocialist parties
Feminist organizations in Croatia
Feminist parties in Europe
Political parties established in 2014
Progressive parties
Socialist feminist organizations
Socialist parties in Croatia